is the 17th compilation album by Japanese entertainer Miho Nakayama. Released through King Records on December 23, 2020 to commemorate Nakayama's 35th anniversary, the three-disc album compiles all 39 of her past singles plus one song from her 2019 album Neuf Neuf. A limited edition release features a bonus Blu-ray disc that includes an HD remaster of Virgin Flight '86: Miho Nakayama First Concert.

The album peaked at No. 29 on Oricon's albums chart and No. 26 on Billboard Japans Hot Albums chart.

Track listing

Charts

References

External links
  (Miho Nakayama)
  (King Records)
 

2020 compilation albums
Miho Nakayama compilation albums
Japanese-language compilation albums
King Records (Japan) compilation albums